United States Naval Mine Test Facility, Provincetown was a testing facility of the United States Navy located in Provincetown, Massachusetts. It was active from 1944 to 1946. After its closure, it was redeveloped into many private uses, including the Provincetown Vocational School.

See also
 List of military installations in Massachusetts

References

External links

Information about the history of the facility

1944 establishments in Massachusetts
1946 disestablishments in Massachusetts
Buildings and structures in Barnstable County, Massachusetts
Closed installations of the United States Navy
Installations of the United States Navy in Massachusetts
Military installations closed in 1946
Military installations established in 1944
Provincetown, Massachusetts